Nette Framework is an open-source framework for creating web applications in PHP 5 and 7. It supports AJAX, DRY, KISS, MVC and code reusability. The original author of the framework is David Grudl, but further development is now maintained by the Nette Foundation organization. Nette is a free software released under both the New BSD license and the GNU GPL version 2 or 3.

Components 
Nette is a full-stack framework composed from a set of decoupled and reusable components.

 Application – The kernel of web application
 Bootstrap – Bootstrap of your application
 Caching – Cache layer with set of storages
 Component Model – Foundation for component systems
 DI – Dependency Injection Container
 Database – Database layer
 Finder – Finds files and directories with intuitive interface
 Forms – Greatly facilitates secure web forms
 Http – Layer for the HTTP request & response
 Latte – template engine
 Mail – Sending E-mails
 Neon – Loads and dumps NEON format
 Php Generator – PHP code generator
 Reflection – PHP class reflection enhancements
 Robot Loader – Comfortable autoloading
 Safe Stream – Safe atomic operations with files
 Security – Provides access control system
 Tester – Comfortable and easy-to-use unit testing tool
 Tokenizer – String tokenization
 Tracy – Debugging tool
 Utils – Utilities and Core Classes
 deprecated – Namespace containing deprecated classes

Development and versioning

See also 
 Comparison of web frameworks

References

Web frameworks
Free computer libraries
PHP frameworks
Software using the BSD license